Gian Luigi Boiardi (9 January 1951 – 18 September 2018) was an Italian politician who served as a Deputy from 2001 to 2005.

References

2018 deaths
Deputies of Legislature XIV of Italy
1951 births
Democrats of the Left politicians
Democratic Party (Italy) politicians
Presidents of the Province of Piacenza